The 2018 FIU Panthers football team represented Florida International University in the 2018 NCAA Division I FBS football season. The Panthers played their home games at the Riccardo Silva Stadium in University Park, Florida as members of the East Division of Conference USA (C–USA). They were led by second-year head coach Butch Davis. They finished the season 9–4, 6–2 in C-USA play to finish in a tie for second place in the East Division. They were invited to the Bahamas Bowl where they defeated Toledo.

Spring Game
The 2018 Spring Game took place in University Park, on April 6, at 7 p.m.

Previous season

The Panthers finished the 2017 season 8–5, 5–3 in C-USA play to finish in second place in the East Division. They received an invitation to the Gasparilla Bowl where they lost to Temple.

Offseason 
Following the conclusion of the 2017 season, several Panthers were invited to participate in the Tropical Bowl, a postseason all star game held on January 14, 2018. Invitations include: Brad Muhammad (DB), Pharoah Mckever (TE) and Anthony Wint (LB).

Departures
Notable departures from the 2017 squad included:

2018 NFL Draft

Panthers who were picked in the 2018 NFL Draft:

Award watch lists
Listed in the order that they were released

Preseason All-CUSA team
Conference USA released their preseason all-CUSA team on July 16, 2018 with the Panthers having two players selected.

Offense

Jordan Budwig – OL

Defense

Fermin Silva – DL

Preseason media poll
Conference USA released their preseason media poll on July 17, 2018, with the Panthers predicted to finish in fourth place in the East Division.

Schedule

Schedule Source:

Game summaries

Indiana

at Old Dominion

UMass

at Miami (FL)

Arkansas–Pine Bluff

Middle Tennessee

Rice

at Western Kentucky

Florida Atlantic

at UTSA

at Charlotte

Marshall

Toledo (Bahamas Bowl)

References

FIU
FIU Panthers football seasons
Bahamas Bowl champion seasons
FIU Panthers football